The Diggs Baronetcy, of Chilham Castle in the County of Kent, was a title in the Baronetage of England. It was created on 6 March 1665 for Maurice Diggs. He was the grandson of Sir Dudley Digges, Master of the Rolls from 1636 to 1639, and the great-grandson of Sir Thomas Digges, the astronomer and mathematician. The title became extinct on Diggs's death in 1666.

Marriage and issue
He married first Beunet, daughter of Mark Dixwell, esq. of Folkestone and Brome, in Kent, and secondly Judith, daughter and co-heir of George Rose, esq. of Eastergate, Sussex, but dying in 1666, the title became extinct.

Diggs baronets, of Chilham Castle (1666)
Sir Maurice Diggs, 1st Baronet (c. 1638–1666)

References

Extinct baronetcies in the Baronetage of England
1666 establishments in England